Julio César Villagra Stadium, nicknamed El Gigante de Alberdi, is a football stadium located in Barrio Alberdi in Córdoba, Argentina. Inaugurated on 17 March 1929, it is the home ground of Club Atlético Belgrano. and has a capacity of 35,000 people. 

The stadium was named after Julio César Villagra (1961–1993), one of the greatest idols of the club, who played for Belgrano from 1982 to 1993, when he died after committing suicide.

History 
The idea to build a stadium came up in 1927 after an initiative from Belgrano's member Carlos Courel, who would then become vicepresident of the club. Belgrano asked mayor of Córdoba, Emilio Olmos, financial support to achieve that aim. Most part of the work was financed by the Municipality of Códoba, which lent the club mn$60,000. The total cost of the construction was about mn$85,000. The Belgrano executives committed to repay the loan in bimonthly payments of $2,000 each.

Alfredo García Voglio was the man behind the project, executed by Patiño and Fontaine Silva company. Works began in July 1928 and the stadium (with an initial capacity of 10,000 spectators) was inaugurated less than one year after, on 17 March 1929. Until then, the main stadium in Córdoba was located on Concepción Arenal and Pablo Riccheri streets of Parque Sarmiento. Inaugurated in 1917, it was the first football field in the city and had a capacity for 6.000. The stadium hosted the main friendly matches in Córdoba until it was closed in 1939.

In the first match at the stadium, Belgrano played a friendly match v Estudiantes de La Plata, which defeated them 6–1. That same year, Belgrano celebrated their first title in their new stadium when the club won the Liga Cordobesa after beating Nacional 2–1. The lightning system was inaugurated in December 1945 in a match v Newell's Old Boys.

In May 1997, the stadium was reinaugurated after being refurbished, hosting the match where Belgrano defeated Argentina U20 2–1. That match was a friendly that served to the national team as preparation for the 1997 FIFA World Youth Championship.

References

External links 

 

Club Atlético Belgrano
Gigante de Alberdi
Buildings and structures in Córdoba, Argentina
Sports venues in Córdoba Province, Argentina
1929 establishments in Argentina